Lawrence Clinton Sinnett (April 4, 1888 – June 11, 1962) was a seaman in the United States Navy and a Medal of Honor recipient for his role in the United States occupation of Veracruz.

Sinnett rose to the rank of chief machinists mate and died on June 11, 1962.  He is buried in Odd Fellows cemetery, Harrisville, West Virginia.

Medal of Honor citation
Rank and organization: Seaman, U.S. Navy. Born: 4 April 1888, Burnt House, W. Va. Accredited to: Pennsylvania. G.O. No.: 101, 15 June 1914.

Citation:

On board the U.S.S. Florida, Sinnett showed extraordinary heroism in the line of his profession during the seizure of Vera Cruz, Mexico, 21 April 1914.

See also

List of Medal of Honor recipients
List of Medal of Honor recipients (Veracruz)

References

1888 births
1962 deaths
United States Navy Medal of Honor recipients
United States Navy sailors
People from Ritchie County, West Virginia
Military personnel from West Virginia
Battle of Veracruz (1914) recipients of the Medal of Honor